The Darbar-e-Hazrat Mai Safoora Qadiriyya was constructed in 1795 by the order of Multan's Afghan ruler Nawab Muzafar Khan.
Durbar depicts the style Qadiri architecture.

See also 
Saleh Muhammad Safoori
Yousaf Tahir

References 

Mausoleums in Pakistan
Toba Tek Singh District